The Journal of Cellular Plastics is a bimonthly peer-reviewed scientific journal that covers the field of polymer science and foamed plastics technology. The journal was established in 1965 and is published by SAGE Publications. it was established in 1965 and the editors-in-chief are Chul B. Park (University of Toronto).

Abstracting and indexing 
The journal is abstracted and indexed in:

According to the Journal Citation Reports, the journal has a 2020 impact factor of 3.073.

References

External links
 

SAGE Publishing academic journals
Bimonthly journals
English-language journals
Publications established in 1965
Materials science journals